is a Japanese footballer currently playing as a goalkeeper for Albirex Niigata.

Career statistics

Club
.

Notes

References

External links

2001 births
Living people
Association football people from Niigata Prefecture
Japanese footballers
Japan youth international footballers
Association football goalkeepers
J2 League players
Albirex Niigata players